Coldharbour , Cold Harbour, or Cold Harbor may refer to:

Places

United Kingdom
England
 Coldharbour, Buckinghamshire, a civil parish
 Coldharbour, Cornwall
 Coldharbour, Surrey
 Coldharbour Mill Working Wool Museum, an industrial museum in Uffculme, Devon
 Cold Harbour, Wiltshire
London
 Coldharbour, City of London, a former liberty
 Coldharbour House, an estate in the above
 Coldharbour, Greenwich, an area of south-east London
 Coldharbour (Lambeth ward), an electoral ward in Brixton
 Coldharbour, Havering
 Coldharbour Lane, a road in South London
 Coldharbour, Tower Hamlets

United States
 Cold Harbor, Virginia
 Cold Harbor National Cemetery, at the site of the Battle of Cold Harbor

Fictional locations
 Coldharbour, the town in The Silver Sequence young adult fantasy novels
 Coldharbour, a plane of Oblivion (realm) of Molag Bal in The Elder Scrolls video game series

Other uses
 Battle of Cold Harbor, American Civil War; a battle near Mechanicsville, Virginia, CSA
 "Coldharbour Lane" (song), a 1982 song by Tom Robinson on the album Cabaret '79
 Coldharbour Recordings, a sublabel of Armada Music
Cold Harbour (novel), a 1924 novel by Francis Brett Young

See also

 
 
 
 
 
 
 
 
 Harbor (disambiguation)
 Cold (disambiguation)
 Coral Harbour, Nunavut, Canada
 Coal Harbor (disambiguation)
 Cole Harbour (disambiguation)